A guard dog or watchdog (not to be confused with an attack dog) is a dog used to watch for and guard people or property against unwanted or unexpected human or animal intruders.

The dog is discerning so that it does not annoy or attack the resident humans of the house.

History 

The use of dogs as guardians is well known since ancient times. The Romans used to put mosaics (Cave canem mosaics) at the entrance of the houses to warn visitors and intruders of the presence of dangerous dogs at the property.

One of the first dog types used as guardians were the ancestral Mastiff-type landraces of the group known as Livestock guardian dogs which protected livestock against large predators such as wolves, bears and leopards. Orthrus is a famous example of a livestock guardian dog from the Greek mythology known for guarding Geryon's red cattle.

Some ancient guard dogs in more urban areas, such as the extinct bandogges, were chained during the day and released at night to protect properties, camps and villages.

Barking

Both guard dogs and watchdogs bark loudly to alert their owners of an intruder's presence and to scare away the intruder. The watchdog's function ends here; a guard dog is then capable of attacking and/or restraining the intruder.

Livestock guardian dogs are often large enough (100-200 lbs.) and strong enough to attack and drive away livestock predators. Some smaller breeds (such as Keeshonden and Tibetan Terriers) are excellent watchdogs, but not guard dogs, because they bark loudly to alert their masters of intruders, but are physically small and not given to assertive behavior. Guard dogs will bark to alert their master and to warn off an approaching animal or human threat prior to their interception of the trespasser. They are different from the smaller watchdogs in that they do not continue barking; they take action. Specifically, livestock guardian dogs such as the Kangal use loud alarm barks as a first line of defense against presumed threats; if these do not deter a perceived foe (either human or animal predators), other displays such as bluffing and charging are employed. For livestock guardians, proactive forms of defense such as bites are only used if all other forms of deterrence fail.

The following breeds are the best at watchdog barking:

 Doberman Pinscher
 German Shepherd Dog
 German Spitz (including Keeshond)
 Miniature Schnauzer
 Scottish Terrier
 West Highland White Terrier

If the risk is from human intruders, a suitable dog can be simply trained to be aggressive towards unrecognized humans and then tethered 
or enclosed unsupervised in an area that the owner wishes to protect when he is not around (such as at night); the stereotypical "junkyard dog" is a common example of this. If the purpose of the dog is to protect against human intruders after nightfall, a large, dark-colored dog in a dark house (lights off) would give the dog an advantage over the burglar.

It is claimed that female dogs tend to make better personal guardians than males, due to maternal instincts, but males are considered better for guarding property because of their greater territorial instinct. That may be true in general, but all dogs are individuals.

Breeds 
Many currently prominent guard dogs started as general purpose farm dogs, but gradually developed into guard breeds. Some dog breeds such as the Dobermann and the Dogue Brasileiro were specifically bred to guard.

Guard dogs are not restricted to mastiffs. Other dogs, like some shepherd dogs, Spitz dogs, cattle dogs and some catch dogs are also great guard dogs as well as being useful as multifunctional dogs, acting as attack dogs, personal protection dogs, police dogs, sport dogs such as schutzhund dogs, etc.

Guard dog breeds tend to be territorial, averse to strangers, dominant, and protective and loyal with family. The Fila Brasileiro for example has a reputation for being very intolerant of strangers and guests to the home and property. Other fierce guard dogs include breeds and landraces of the Ovtcharka type and other farm guard dogs such as the Boerboel.

Some breeds who make excellent guards are more commonly having breed specific legislation passed against them, banning them from some communities and whole countries.

Legality

The laws regarding ownership and usage of guard dogs vary from country to country. In England the main legislation relating to the use of guard dogs on commercial premises are contained within the 1975 Guard Dogs Act. The act specifies the requirements of kennels and the need to display guard dog warning signs at the entrance to sites.

See also 

 
 
 
 
 Faithful Ruslan

References

External links

Working dogs
Dogs in warfare